The Upper Marlboro Residential Historic District is a national historic district encompassing a historic residential area of  Upper Marlboro, Maryland.  The area reflects the town's growth from the 18th to the 20th century, including its importance as the county seat of Prince George's County.  The district also contained a significant post-American Civil War African-American population, which was making the transition from slavery to freedom. Located in the district are three previously listed properties: Kingston, Content, and the John H. Traband House. Prominent features of the district include the Trinity Episcopal Church at 14519 Church Street, an 1846 Gothic Revival church designed by Robert Carey Long, Jr., and 5415 Old Crain Highway, a -story wood-frame house dated to c. 1730, which is believed to be the oldest building in the town.

The district was listed on the National Register of Historic Places in 2012.

References

External links
, including undated photo and map, at Maryland Historical Trust website

African-American history of Prince George's County, Maryland
Historic districts in Prince George's County, Maryland
Gothic Revival church buildings in Maryland
Greek Revival houses in Maryland
Queen Anne architecture in Maryland
Colonial Revival architecture in Maryland
Houses on the National Register of Historic Places in Maryland
Houses in Prince George's County, Maryland
Historic districts on the National Register of Historic Places in Maryland
National Register of Historic Places in Prince George's County, Maryland